Jane Loop was an important Toronto Transit Commission (TTC) streetcar turning loop and bus station, prior to the completion of the Bloor Danforth Subway line. The Jane Loop opened on December 31, 1923; it was the western end of Bloor Streetcar line from 1925 to 1968. The loop was at a boundary between two zones in the TTC's zoned fare system. Half a dozen or so buses and trolleybuses terminated at the loop.

Background
In 1915, the Toronto Civic Railways, owned by the City of Toronto, opened its Bloor streetcar line along Bloor Street west from Dundas Street initially to Indian Road then later to Runneymede Road in 1917. The TCR used double-ended streetcars, so there were crossovers at each end of the line. After the Toronto Transportation Commission took over the TCR in 1921, it extended the line further west to Jane Street terminating at a newly constructed Jane Loop. At this time, there were no streetcar tracks on Bloor Street between Lansdowne Avenue and Dundas Street, and the TTC named the line west of Dundas Street as the "Bloor West" line. However, on August 25, 1925, the Bloor streetcar line was extended west from Lansdowne Avenue to Dundas Street and Jane Loop, absorbing the former Bloor West line. In 1966, the Bloor–Danforth subway line replaced the Bloor streetcar line between Woodbine and Keele stations. From then, the Bloor streetcar shuttle started running between Keele station and Jane Loop until replaced by an extension of the subway line in 1968.

Design
By the 1960s the facility had two structures.  The facility had two concentric loops with a covered crescent shaped structure that protected passengers from the sun and rain as they boarded, unboarded, or waited for their vehicles.
The inner loop was reserved exclusively for streetcars, which entered the inner loop in a counter-clockwise direction, so their doors opened onto the inner edge of the crescent shaped structure.  Buses and trolleybuses entered the outer loop in a clockwise direction, so their doors opened onto the outer edge of the crescent shaped structure.

Passengers could ask for paper transfers when they boarded the first vehicle on their route, if they planned to transfer to another vehicle in the same zone.

A small structure in the center of the loops housed a ticket agent and coffee shop.
The TTC owned and operated a subsidiary, Gray Coach, which ran intercity buses throughout southern Ontario.  Tickets for intercity Gray Couch routes could be purchased there.

Legacy

In 2017 Graham Jackson published a coming of age novel, entitled The Jane Loop, which revolved around the gateway the loop posed between the sleepy suburbs and Toronto's more sophisticated downtown.

References

External links

Toronto streetcar loops